Denis O'Miachain (also recorded as Tomás Ó Miadacháin) was Archdeacon of Achonry until 1266 when he was consecrated Bishop of Achonry; he died in 1285.

References 

1285 deaths
13th-century Irish Roman Catholic priests
Archdeacons of Achonry
Bishops of Achonry